Carpenter Historic District is a national historic district located near Cary, Wake County, North Carolina.  The districts encompasses 66 contributing buildings, 1 contributing site, and 8  contributing structures in the rural crossroads community of Carpenter.  The district developed between about 1895 and 1933, and includes notable examples of Late Victorian and Colonial Revival style architecture.  Notable buildings include the Carpenter Farm Supply Company (c. 1895, 1916), D. Judson Clark Machine/Garage (c. 1920), Byrd-Ferrell House (c. 1900), Mallie and Cora Butts Farm, A.M. Howard Farm, and Barbee-Williams Farm.

It was listed on the National Register of Historic Places in 2000.

References

Historic districts on the National Register of Historic Places in North Carolina
Victorian architecture in North Carolina
Colonial Revival architecture in North Carolina
Buildings and structures in Wake County, North Carolina
National Register of Historic Places in Wake County, North Carolina